William Gloag may refer to:
 William Gloag (lawyer) (1865–1934), Scottish lawyer and academic
 William Gloag, Lord Kincairney (1828–1909), Scottish judge
 William Gloag (minister) (c. 1735–1802), Church of Scotland minister